Eugene Jackson (born September 23, 1966) is an American former mixed martial artist who competed in the middleweight division of the Ultimate Fighting Championship and Strikeforce. Jackson was the only Strikeforce U.S. Middleweight Champion.

Mixed martial arts career

Early career
Jackson compiled a professional mixed martial arts record of 9-3-1 that included winning the Bas Rutten Invitational 1 Middleweight tournament over Joe Doerksen as well as losing to future Pride Middleweight Champion, Wanderlei Silva whilst competing for the IVC Cruiserweight Championship before signing for UFC in 1999.

Ultimate Fighting Championship
Jackson made his UFC debut at middleweight on July 16, 1999, against Royce Alger at UFC 21. He won the fight via KO with punches in the second round.

Jackson then faced Keiichiro Yamamiya on November 19, 1999, at UFC 23. He won the fight via KO with a punch in the third round.

Jackson then faced Sanae Kikuta on April 14, 2000, at UFC 25. He lost the fight via an armbar submission in the first round.

Jackson then faced Jeremy Horn on September 22, 2000, at UFC 27. He lost the fight via an armbar submission in the first round.

Jackson then faced Ricardo Almeida on September 28, 2001, at UFC 33. He lost the fight via a triangle choke submission in the first round.

Jackson then faced Keith Rockel on January 11, 2002, at UFC 35. He won the fight via a guillotine choke submission in the second round thus snapping a three-fight losing streak.

Jackson's final UFC bout came against Mark Weir on July 13, 2002, at UFC 38. He lost the fight via KO with a punch in the first round.

Strikeforce
Jackson made his Strikeforce debut against Jorge Ortiz on March 10, 2006, at Strikeforce: Shamrock vs. Gracie. He won the fight via unanimous decision.

Jackson then faced Mike Seal on June 9, 2006, at Strikeforce: Revenge. He won the fight via TKO due to punches in the second round.

Jackson then faced Ronald Jhun for the inaugural Strikeforce U.S. Middleweight Championship on December 8, 2006, at Strikeforce: Triple Threat. He won the fight via a rear naked choke submission in the first round thus being the sole person to win the title.

Jackson's final fight came against Joe Riggs on September 29, 2007, at Strikeforce: Playboy Mansion. He lost the fight via KO due to punches in the first round.

Personal life
Jackson appeared as a playable character in the video game, Ultimate Fighting Championship that was released in 2000.

Jackson is the father of two sons, Nikko and Casey who were both mixed martial artists and worked as martial arts trainers at East Palo Alto gym and Rogue Empire respectively. Nikko died in September 2020.

Jackson runs Gladiators Training Academy in East Palo Alto, California, wherein he has trained fighters that include UFC alumni, Ashlee Evans-Smith.

Additionally, Jackson works for East Palo Alto youth empowerment charity, Live in Peace.

Championships and accomplishments

Bas Rutten Invitational 1
Bas Rutten Invitational 1 Middleweight Tournament
Strikeforce
Strikeforce U.S. Middleweight Championship (One time, first, last)

Mixed martial arts record

|-
|Loss
|align=center|15-9-1
|Joe Riggs
|KO (punches)
|Strikeforce: Playboy Mansion
|
|align=center|1
|align=center|3:56
|Los Angeles, California, United States
|
|-
|Win
|align=center|15-8-1
|Ronald Jhun
|Submission (rear-naked choke)
|Strikeforce: Triple Threat
|
|align=center|1
|align=center|2:01
|San Jose, California, United States
|
|-
|Win
|align=center|14-8-1
|Mike Seal
|TKO (punches)
|Strikeforce: Revenge
|
|align=center|2
|align=center|2:49
|San Jose, California, United States
|
|-
|Win
|align=center|13-8-1
|Jorge Ortiz
|Decision (unanimous)
|Strikeforce: Shamrock vs. Gracie
|
|align=center|3
|align=center|5:00
|San Jose, California, United States
|
|-
|Loss
|align=center|12-8-1
|Tony Fryklund
|TKO (guillotine choke)
|Battleground 1: War Cry
|
|align=center|1
|align=center|3:38
|Chicago, Illinois, United States
|
|-
|Loss
|align=center|12-7-1
|Mark Weir
|KO (punch)
|UFC 38
|
|align=center|1
|align=center|0:10
|London, England
|
|-
|Win
|align=center|12-6-1
|Keith Rockel
|Submission (guillotine choke)
|UFC 35
|
|align=center|2
|align=center|3:46
|Uncasville, Connecticut, United States
|
|-
|Loss
|align=center|11-6-1
|Ricardo Almeida
|Submission (triangle choke)
|UFC 33
|
|align=center|1
|align=center|4:06
|Las Vegas, Nevada, United States
|
|-
|Loss
|align=center|11-5-1
|Jeremy Horn
|Submission (armbar)
|UFC 27
|
|align=center|1
|align=center|4:32
|New Orleans, Louisiana, United States
|
|-
|Loss
|align=center|11-4-1
|Sanae Kikuta
|Submission (armbar)
|UFC 25
|
|align=center|1
|align=center|4:38
|Tokyo, Tokyo, Canada
|
|-
|Win
|align=center|11-3-1
|Keiichiro Yamamiya
|KO (punch)
|UFC 23
|
|align=center|3
|align=center|3:12
|Urayasu, Chiba, Japan
|
|-
|Win
|align=center|10-3-1
|Royce Alger
|KO (punch)
|UFC 21
|
|align=center|2
|align=center|1:19
|Cedar Rapids, Iowa, United States
|
|-
|Loss
|align=center|9-3-1
|Wanderlei Silva
|TKO (submission to punches)
|IVC 10: World Class Champions
|
|align=center|1
|align=center|0:32
|Brazil
|
|-
|Win
|align=center|9-2-1
|Jake Laroche
|KO (punches)
|WCNHBC: West Coast NHB Championships 2
|
|align=center|1
|align=center|8:17
|Compton, California, United States
|
|-
|Win
|align=center|8-2-1
|Joe Doerksen
|Submission (neck crank)
|BRI 1: Bas Rutten Invitational 1
|
|align=center|1
|align=center|1:15
|Denver, Colorado, United States
|
|-
|Win
|align=center|7-2-1
|Tom Bolger
|Submission (guillotine choke)
|BRI 1: Bas Rutten Invitational 1
|
|align=center|1
|align=center|0:24
|Denver, Colorado, United States
|
|-
|Win
|align=center|6-2-1
|Joe Riley
|Submission (choke)
|BRI 1: Bas Rutten Invitational 1
|
|align=center|1
|align=center|0:25
||Denver, Colorado, United States
|
|-
|Win
|align=center|5-2-1
|Mark Walker
|Submission (forearm choke)
|BRI 1: Bas Rutten Invitational 1
|
|align=center|1
|align=center|0:57
|Denver, Colorado, United States
|
|-
|Draw
|align=center|4-2-1
|Beau Hershberger
|Draw
|NG 9: Neutral Grounds 9
|
|align=center|1
|align=center|10:00
|
|
|-
|Win
|align=center|4-2
|Ronald Jhun
|Technical Submission (forearm choke)
|SB 8: SuperBrawl 8
|
|align=center|1
|align=center|1:17
|Honolulu, Hawaii, United States
|
|-
|Win
|align=center|3-2
|Dustin Dawson
|Technical Submission (rear-naked choke)
|SB 8: SuperBrawl 8
|
|align=center|1
|align=center|0:19
|Honolulu, Hawaii, United States
|
|-
|Loss
|align=center|2-2
|Tim Lajcik
|Submission (rear-naked choke)
|IFC WC 2: Warriors Challenge 2
|
|align=center|1
|align=center|9:49
|California, United States
|
|-
|Win
|align=center|2-1
|Mason White
|Submission (choke)
|IFC WC 2: Warriors Challenge 2
|
|align=center|1
|align=center|2:40
|California, United States
|
|-
|Win
|align=center|1-1
|Toby Oberdine
|Submission (rear-naked choke)
|IFC WC 2: Warriors Challenge 2
|
|align=center|1
|align=center|2:31
|California, United States
|
|-
|Loss
|align=center|0-1
|M Wahyudi
|Submission (armbar)
|IFC WC 1: Warriors Challenge 1
|
|align=center|0
|align=center|0:00
|Jackson, California, United States
|
|-

See also 
 List of male mixed martial artists

References

External links 

 
 

1966 births
Living people
Middleweight mixed martial artists
Sportspeople from California
Mixed martial artists from California
American male mixed martial artists
Ultimate Fighting Championship male fighters